KD Hang Tuah is a frigate formerly operated by the Royal Malaysian Navy from 1977 until 2018. She is now a museum ship. She was built in the United Kingdom, originally for the Ghana Navy, but was launched and completed as a private venture, before being purchased by the Royal Navy in 1972. She served for five years as HMS Mermaid (F76) before being purchased by Malaysia, where she replaced another ex-British frigate also called Hang Tuah. She became a training ship in 1992 and was refitted to replace obsolete weapons and machinery.

Development
Hang Tuah was a singleton vessel, originally built for Ghana. It was to have been named Black Star and to have functioned as the flagship of Ghana's navy as well as the presidential yacht for Kwame Nkrumah, the President of Ghana. Built by Yarrow Shipbuilders on the River Clyde in Scotland, the new frigate was still on the slipway, when in February 1966, a military coup in Ghana ousted President Nkrumah; the new government cancelled the order due to the excessive cost of around GBP 5 million. Yarrow decided that the best course was to complete the ship in the hope that she could be sold to another navy; she was launched without any ceremony in December 1966.

The frigate was completed in June 1968 and kept at anchor for several years awaiting a buyer. In 1971, the newly elected Conservative government decided that by purchasing the ship for the Royal Navy, they could provide an indirect subsidy to a vital shipbuilder. Accordingly, in April 1972, she was transferred to Portsmouth Dockyard and then to Chatham Dockyard, to be refitted to bring her up to operational standards.

Design 
The hull and machinery of the ship were based on the British Type 41 and Type 61 frigates, but modified to suit the requirements of the Ghana Navy. The hull was flush decked; the large quarterdeck could be used to land a helicopter but there were no facilities to operate one. The exhausts from the eight diesel engines were trunked into a single streamlined funnel.

There were extra accommodation areas in the superstructure including a large dining and conference room. The armament and sensors were kept relatively simple to keep the cost down and for ease of maintenance. Mounted forward of the bridge was a Mark 19 mounting with twin QF 4 inch Mk 16 dual-purpose guns, there were four single Bofors 40 mm guns around the upper superstructure, and a Squid anti-submarine mortar mounted aft in a well. Sonar Types 170 and 176 were carried as was a Plessey AWS-1 radar on the foremast and a navigational radar forward of this on a platform.

Royal Navy service 
Her light armament and minimal sensor fittings made her unsuitable for a role in the European environment but could provide a useful presence in the Far East, undertaking what is now known as 'defence diplomacy' roles.

Returning to home waters in 1976, Mermaid was deployed to protect British trawlers off Iceland during the Third Cod War. After a previous ramming incident with the Icelandic gunboat   on 12 March, she suffered heavy collision damage on 6 May during aggressive manoeuvring with the patrol boat . During a NATO exercise on 20 September 1976, she was involved in a collision with the minesweeper  that resulted in the Fittletons sinking and the deaths of 12 personnel, mainly RNR members.

Mermaid'''s last task before being paid off was to conduct trials on a moving target indication system that enabled radar to pick out targets moving against the clutter generated by the surface of the sea. Her Royal Navy career of only five years ended in early 1977. She was the last British warship to operate twin 4-inch guns, which had been in service for well over thirty years.

 Royal Malaysian Navy service 
In April 1977 she was transferred to the Royal Malaysian Navy and commissioned at Southampton on 22 July, and named Hang Tuah after a legendary 15th century Malaccan warrior and Laksamana (admiral). Although Mermaid took her predecessor's name, the Malaysian Navy retained the British pennant number F76. For a number of years she served as the flagship of the Royal Malaysian Navy after joining  as the two major assets of the Royal Malaysian Navy.Hang Tuah became a training ship in 1992. In 1992, Hang Tuah is serving as a training ship and is assigned to Frigate Squadron 21. In April 2017, Hang Tuah was one of the Malaysian Navy ships which were opened to the public at the "Armada 2017" event at Lumut naval base, where she celebrated her 40th anniversary. Hang Tuah was retired in 2018 and turned into a museum ship.

References

Publications
 Baker, A.D. The Naval Institute Guide to Combat Fleets of the World 1998–1999''. Annapolis, Maryland: Naval Institute Press, 1998. .

External links
 Rare and Original Photo of KD Rahmat 
 Photo of KD Rahmat
 CLYDE-BUILT DATABASE

 

Frigates of the Ghana Navy
Ships built on the River Clyde
1966 ships
Ships of the Fishery Protection Squadron of the United Kingdom
Frigates of the Royal Malaysian Navy
Naval ships of Malaysia
Museum ships in Malaysia